The Advanced Tactical Fighter (ATF) was a demonstration and validation program undertaken by the United States Air Force to develop a next-generation air superiority fighter to counter emerging worldwide threats, including Soviet Sukhoi Su-27 and Mikoyan MiG-29 fighters under development in the 1980s.  Lockheed and Northrop were selected in  1986 to develop the YF-22 and the YF-23 technology demonstrator aircraft.  These aircraft were evaluated in 1991 and the Lockheed YF-22 was selected and later developed into the F-22 Raptor.

History

Background

In 1981, USAF began forming requirements for a new air superiority fighter intended to replace the capability of the F-15 Eagle.  In June 1981 a request for information (RFI) for the Advanced Tactical Fighter (ATF) was published by the Air Force.  Design concepts were provided by defense contractors.  The common areas among the concepts were stealth, STOL and supercruise.  It was envisioned that the ATF would incorporate emerging technologies including advanced alloys and composite material, advanced fly-by-wire flight control systems, higher power propulsion systems, and low-observable, or stealth technology.

In September 1983, study contracts were awarded to seven airframe manufacturers for further definition of their designs. A request for proposals (RFP) for the fighter's engine, called the Joint Advanced Fighter Engine (JAFE), was released in May 1983. Pratt & Whitney and General Electric received contracts for the development and production of prototype engines in September 1983.

Request for proposals
A request for proposals (RFP) for the fighter was issued in September 1985.  In May 1986, the Air Force changed the RFP so that final selection would involve flying prototypes.  In July 1986, proposals were provided by Boeing, General Dynamics, Lockheed, Northrop, and McDonnell Douglas.  Two contractors, Lockheed and Northrop were selected in October 1986 to undertake a 50-month demonstration/validation phase, culminating in the flight test of two technology demonstrator prototypes, the YF-22 and the YF-23.  Under terms of agreements between Lockheed, General Dynamics, and Boeing, the companies agreed to participate in the development jointly if only one company's design was selected.  Northrop and McDonnell Douglas had a similar agreement.

During the demonstration/validation phase of development, the USAF focused on system engineering, technology development plans, and risk reduction over point aircraft designs. Both contractor teams conducted performance and cost trade studies and presented them in system requirement reviews (SRRs) with the USAF. This enabled the USAF to adjust ATF requirements and delete ones that were significant weight and cost drivers while having marginal operational value. As avionics was a significant cost driver, side-looking radars were deleted, and the dedicated infrared search and track (IRST) system was downgraded from requirement to goal. The ejection seat requirement was downgraded from a fresh design to the existing McDonnell Douglas ACES II.

Two examples of each prototype were built for the Demonstration-Validation phase: one with General Electric YF120 engines, the other with Pratt & Whitney YF119 engines. The first YF-23 made its maiden flight on 27 August 1990 and the first YF-22 first flew on 29 September 1990.  Flight testing began afterwards and added the second aircraft for each competitor in late October 1990.  The first YF-23 with P&W engines supercruised at Mach 1.43 on 18 September 1990 and the second YF-23 with GE engines reached Mach 1.6 on 29 November 1990.  The YF-22 with GE engines achieved Mach 1.58 in supercruise.  Flight testing continued until December 1990.  Following flight testing, the contractor teams submitted proposals for ATF production.

Selection
Following a review of the flight test results and proposals, the Air Force announced the Lockheed YF-22 with Pratt & Whitney engines as the competition winner on 23 April 1991. The YF-23 design was stealthier and faster, but the YF-22 was more agile.  The US Navy had begun considering a version of the ATF called Navy Advanced Tactical Fighter (NATF) in 1986.  It has been speculated in the aviation press that the YF-22 was also seen as more adaptable to the NATF.  The Navy abandoned NATF by 1992.

The Lockheed team was awarded the contract to develop and build the Advanced Tactical Fighter in August 1991.  The YF-22 was modified into the production F-22 Raptor version.  The Northrop YF-23 design was later considered by the company for modification as a bomber, but the proposals have not come to fruition.

See also
Have Dash
Joint Strike Fighter program

References

Citations

Bibliography
 Goodall, James C. "The Lockheed YF-22 and Northrop YF-23 Advanced Tactical Fighters". America's Stealth Fighters and Bombers, B-2, F-117, YF-22, and YF-23. St. Paul, Minnesota: MBI Publishing Company, 1992. .
 Jenkins, Dennis R. and Tony R. Landis. Experimental & Prototype U.S. Air Force Jet Fighters. North Branch, Minnesota: Specialty Press, 2008. .
 Miller, Jay. Lockheed Martin F/A-22 Raptor, Stealth Fighter. Hinckley, UK: Midland Publishing, 2005. .
 Pace, Steve. F-22 Raptor. New York: McGraw-Hill, 1999. .
 Sweetman, Bill. YF-22 and YF-23 Advanced Tactical Fighters. St. Paul, Minnesota: Motorbooks International Publishing, 1991. .

Military aircraft procurement programs of the United States
Stealth aircraft